Carnival Inspiration (formerly Inspiration) was a  operated by Carnival Cruise Line. Built by Kværner Masa-Yards at its Helsinki New Shipyard in Helsinki, Finland, she was floated out on April 1, 1996, and christened as Inspiration by Mary Anne Shula.  During 2007, in common with all of her Fantasy-class sisters, she had the prefix Carnival added to her name and had some passenger areas and facilities were refurbished.

In July 2020, Carnival sold Carnival Inspiration, along with her sister ship Carnival Fantasy. Cruise Radio reported that Carnival Inspiration will likely be scrapped in Turkey.  She made her final voyage from Long Beach and arrived at Aliağa on August 5, 2020 and by August 26, was being dismantled. Scrapping started on her on 5 April 2021, and concluded around January 2022.

References
Bibliography

Notes

External links

Official website

Ships built in Helsinki
Inspiration
Fantasy-class cruise ships
1996 ships